Jason Goss (born October 4, 1979 in Fort Worth, Texas) is a Canadian football defensive back who is currently a free agent. He was most recently with the Edmonton Eskimos of the Canadian Football League. He has played five seasons in the CFL and was named CFL All-Star in 2008.

Goss was released by the Eskimos on December 16, 2010.

References

1979 births
Living people
American players of Canadian football
Arizona Cardinals players
Canadian football defensive backs
Edmonton Elks players
Hamilton Tiger-Cats players
Sportspeople from Fort Worth, Texas
TCU Horned Frogs football players